, is a fictional character from both the Final Fight and Street Fighter series. Like Sodom before him, he first appeared as a boss character in Final Fight, but later evolved into a playable fighter in Street Fighter Alpha 2.

Appearances
Rolento made his debut appearance as the fourth stage's boss in the original Final Fight. He is a former member of the fictional Red Beret special forces unit and serves as the supervisor of the Mad Gear gang's weapons plant. When defeated, instead of just fading away while lying on the ground like most enemies in the game, he stands up and blows himself up with his own grenades, fading away completely scorched. Rolento and his "Industrial Area" stage were not included in the Super Nintendo Entertainment System port of Final Fight, nor in its re-release Final Fight Guy, but were included in other ports of the game, such as the Sega CD and Game Boy Advance versions (if the player confronts Rolento as "Alpha Cody" in the GBA version, Cody will joke about Rolento's omission in the SNES version). In the SNES-exclusive sequel Final Fight 2, Rolento serves as the boss of the fifth stage, Italy (his name is transliterated as "Rolent" both in the game and in the instruction booklet).

His debut as a playable fighter was in the fighting game Street Fighter Alpha 2 in 1996, in which he seeks to build a military utopia following the downfall of the Mad Gear gang and wants to recruit his former ally and nemesis, Sodom and Guy respectively, to his cause. Rolento's ending in Alpha 2 depicts him invading the streets of Metro City after forming his own army. In Street Fighter Alpha 3, Rolento tries to persuade Cody, another former nemesis, to join his army. In his ending, Rolento attempts to infiltrate Shadaloo's underground base to gain M. Bison's secret weapon, the Psycho Drive, only to destroy it with Sodom's help. His Alpha series' incarnation also appears as a playable character in the 2001 crossover fighting game Capcom vs. SNK 2, as well as in the 1999 fighting game Final Fight Revenge which follows his backstory from the Alpha series.

Rolento returns as a playable character in the 2012 crossover fighting game Street Fighter X Tekken, where his official tag partner is the ninja girl Ibuki. In 2013, he was announced to appear as a playable character in Ultra Street Fighter IV.

Other appearances
Rolento made his first appearance outside the Final Fight series in the original Street Fighter Alpha: Warriors' Dreams, where he makes a cameo in Sodom's ending among other former Mad Gear members gathered by Sodom to help rebuild the gang. Although he does not appear in Street Fighter EX, Rolento also plays a role in Doctrine Dark's backstory in this game, as the one responsible for physically crippling him and causing his psychotic breakdown.

He also makes a cameo appearance in Super Gem Fighter Mini Mix, is available in the SNK vs. Capcom: Card Fighters Clash series, and appears in Capcom World 2. Outside of video games, Rolento appears in the Street Fighter animated series, in the anime OAV miniseries Street Fighter Alpha: The Animation, in the Street Fighter comic book Street Fighter II Turbo, and in the manga Sakura Ganbaru. In 2012, Rolento returned to boss role in the platform game Street Fighter X Mega Man, as an enemy of Mega Man.

Design and gameplay
Rolento was created by Ishizawa "Neo_G" Hidetoshi, in the concept stages, his name was supposed to be Laurence (ローレンス, Rourensu) or arguably Laurent, but due to the confusion between "l" and "r" and additions of vowels at the end of words in transliteration, Laurence was changed into "Rolent", which has the letter "o" added at the end of that name later on in development, because the Japanese language doesn't have lone consonants, except words that end with the letter "n" (ん), so any rōmaji/hepburn word that ends in a consonant in English, must end with a vowel. His appearance is modeled after the commanding officer of Golan: Colonel (大佐カーネル, Kāneru) who is one of the minor antagonists in the Fist of the North Star manga and anime. Rolento was given a similar uniform to Colonel's, but with no armour, no eye-patch, different weapons, and with camouflage tiger-stripes on his uniform so he could bear a resemblance to the Maroon Beret US Soldiers of the Vietnam War. 

In Street Fighter, Rolento wears a militant outfit with weapon belts (where he keeps his grenades) going over his shoulders and a red beret on his head. He has a red scarf under his worn yellow military outfit and fights with a stick. This is a change from how he originally appeared in Final Fight, in which he wore a Tiger Stripes colour scheme uniform and wielded a brown club. Tekken character Nina Williams received a Rolento-style alternate costume in an update for Street Fighter X Tekken.

In Final Fight, he fights using a rod and resorts to throwing grenades when he is low on energy.  Rolento's fighting style in the Street Fighter games is based broadly on his Final Fight counterpart. He uses his rod and grenades from Final Fight, as well as throwing knives and wires. One of Rolento's super combos in the Alpha series, "Take No Prisoners", involves his opponent being hooked to the ceiling by either El Gado or Holly Wood, enemy characters from Final Fight who appear to be working for Rolento during the Alpha series.

Reception
IGN's review of Street Fighter Alpha 2 praised Capcom's designs for the new characters, amongst them Rolento, but in a preview of Capcom vs. SNK 2, IGN's David Smith wrote that "Rolento is strong…but he's just no fun to watch." Askmen.com nominated Rolento as one of the five characters they wanted to be included in Street Fighter IV. In 2010, Rolento was ranked as 34th-best Street Fighter character by UGO Networks, who noted that his finishers (Ultra Combos) are some of the more impressive in the series and that he was rumored to appear in Super Street Fighter IV. That same year, European Street Fighter champion Ryan Hart ranked Rolento as the tenth-best Street Fighter character in a list compiled for The Guardian. Rolento is, however, rarely voted for in the official polls for the best Street Fighter characters according to Street Fighter fans. He also featured on UGO's list of most memorable Italians in video games, placing 13th. His "In my ideal nation, there would exist no one as weak as you!" from Alpha 3 was included on the list of the most humiliating video game victory quotes by Complex in 2012.

References

External links
 Rolento - The Street Fighter Wiki

Characters designed by Akira Yasuda
Fictional American people in video games
Fictional gang members
Fictional German American people
Fictional Special Operations Forces of the United States
Fictional Vietnam War veterans
Fictional soldiers in video games
Fictional eskrimadors
Fictional bojutsuka
Final Fight characters
Male characters in video games
Fictional mercenaries in video games
Fictional military personnel in video games
Street Fighter characters
Video game bosses
Video game characters introduced in 1989